The Midwestern Universities Research Association (MURA) was a collaboration between 15 universities with the goal of designing and building a particle accelerator for the Midwestern United States. It existed between 1953–1967, but could not achieve its goal in this time and lost funding. It was thought that President John F. Kennedy would have supported the MURA machine, while one of President Lyndon B. Johnson's first actions was the shutdown of the MURA machine and laboratory.

In its formative years, Donald Kerst was the director of MURA. At this institution, Keith Symon invented the FFAG accelerator, independently to Tihiro Ohkawa, which combines several concepts of cyclotrons and synchrotrons. FFAG concepts were extensively developed in MURA. The proposed MURA accelerators were scaling FFAG synchrotrons, meaning that orbits of any momentum are photographic enlargements of those of any other momentum.

The concept of FFAG acceleration was revived in the early 1980s, and gained interest up to the present day, see e.g. EMMA (accelerator).

References

Further reading
 F. Cole. O Camelot. Supplement to Proc. 16th Intl. Conf. on Cyclotrons and their Applications (Cyclotrons 2001)
this paper was published posthumously.
 
A book by MURA veterans that was designed to augment Cole's posthumous manuscript.
 Daniel S. Greenberg, Chapters X and XI of The Politics of Pure Science, Plume Books, 1967, University of Chicago Press, 1999.
deals with politics around MURA, particularly the battle over funding higher energy machines being studied at Berkeley and at Brookhaven (New York) and funding MURA, a machine that would produce the same energy as Argonne's Zero Gradient Synchrotron but at 100 fold the intensity.

College and university associations and consortia in the United States
Research projects
Defunct organizations based in the United States
1953 establishments in the United States
1967 disestablishments in the United States
Physics organizations
Collaborative projects
Accelerator physics